Olšina ( or Wolsina) is an extinct village in Ralsko in the Česká Lípa District in the Czech Republic. It lies in the former Ralsko military training area, about 13 kilometres east of Mimoň.

History
The village was populated by both German-speaking and Czech-speaking Bohemians. In the mid-19th century, Wolschen/Olšina became part of the judicial district of Niemes for the Habsburg Crownland of Bohemia (and later for Austria-Hungary). This district included 26 small villages in a large wooded area east of Niemes/Mimoň.

In the early 1900s, Wolschen had 46 houses and 214 inhabitants, (mainly German-speaking with only a few Czechs). Agriculture, livestock and forestry were the main sources of livelihood. There was a church, a water pond, a school, three inns, two shops with several craftsmen and merchants. The village also had its own gendarmerie (sheriff), telephone connection, post office, brickyard, steam-powered sawmill and a milk dairy with a high chimney. The village was wired for electricity around 1922. The nearest railway station was at Niemes/Mimoň.

After World War II, in 1947, Wolschen and the other villages in the area became part of the Ralsko military training area for decades. Most of the villages in this restricted area were destroyed. The military testing area was shut down in 1991 after Czechoslovakia's Velvet Revolution. Plans were being made to turn the area into a natural reserve/tourist area. There are only scant remnants of the village today.

References

Former villages in the Czech Republic
Česká Lípa District